Peniasi Silatolu is a former Fijian politician, who won the Nasinu Rewa Open Constituency in the House of Representatives for Interim Prime Minister Laisenia Qarase's party, the Soqosoqo Duavata ni Lewenivanua (SDL), in the parliamentary election of 2001.

Silatolu's success came on his second attempt.  He had unsuccessfully contested the same seat in the previous election of 1999 for the Christian Democratic Alliance.

Silatolu retired from politics at the parliamentary election held on 6–13 May 2006.

References

Soqosoqo Duavata ni Lewenivanua politicians
I-Taukei Fijian members of the House of Representatives (Fiji)
Living people
Christian Democratic Alliance (Fiji) politicians
Politicians from Lomanikoro
Year of birth missing (living people)